Representative money or receipt money is any medium of exchange, printed or digital, that represents something of value, but has little or no value of its own (intrinsic value). Unlike some forms of fiat money (which may have no commodity backing), genuine representative money must have something of intrinsic value supporting the face value.

More specifically, the term representative money has been used variously to mean:
 A claim on a commodity, for example gold and silver certificates. In this sense it may be called "commodity-backed money".
 Any type of money that has face value greater than its value as material substance.  Used in this sense, most types of fiat money are a type of representative money.

There is no concrete evidence that the clay tokens used as an accounting tool to keep track of warehouse stores in ancient Mesopotamia were also used as representative money.
 However, the idea has been suggested.

In 1895 economist Joseph Shield Nicholson wrote that credit expansion and contraction was in fact the expansion and contraction of representative money.

In 1934 economist William Howard Steiner wrote that the term was used "at one time to signify that a certain amount of bullion was stored in the Treasury while the equivalent paper in circulation" represented the bullion.

See also
Commodity money
Gold standard
Hard currency
Silver standard
Store of value

References

Currency
Metallism